Steppenwolf (German for "Steppe wolf") is a supervillain appearing in comic books published by DC Comics. Created by writer-artist Jack Kirby, the character is introduced in New Gods #7 (February 1972). A New God and military general from the planet Apokolips, Steppenwolf is the brother of Heggra and therefore the maternal uncle of Darkseid. He is commonly depicted as Darkseid's subordinate, commanding his nephew's army of Parademons in conflicts against Superman and the Justice League.

The character is featured in the DC Extended Universe and made his live-action debut in the film Batman v Superman: Dawn of Justice with the use of computer-generated imagery, before being portrayed through motion capture by Ciarán Hinds in both the theatrical release and the director's cut of Justice League.

Fictional character biography
Steppenwolf is a New God who is the younger brother of Heggra (Darkseid's mother) and the uncle of Uxas (Darkseid). He is also a member of Darkseid's Elite. He leads the military forces of Apokolips and rides hounds bred for battle. 

Steppenwolf is one of the earliest survivors of Doomsday, the monster who once killed Superman. Two hundred forty-five thousand years ago, Steppenwolf takes an Apokoliptian shuttle with Darkseid, Master Mayhem and a small crew to the planet of Bylan 5. The planet holds delicate natural materials Apokolips needs for weaponry, material which would be destroyed in the event of an invasion. The forcible marriage of Darkseid to the planet's princess comes to an end when Doomsday attacks. Master Mayhem is swiftly torn apart. Darkseid ignores Steppenwolf's orders to use omega beams and engages the creature in hand-to-hand combat. Steppenwolf sees that the destruction that has been wrought has doomed the planet, and all who live on it. He teleports Darkseid out of harm's way, agreeing with Darkseid not to mention this to anyone. Doomsday escapes by stowing away on the Apokoliptian shuttle.

Most of Steppenwolf's appearances under the pen of Jack Kirby are in flashbacks. His debut, in New Gods #7, was a flashback story in which he helps Darkseid murder the wife of Darkseid's hated rival, Highfather. Highfather later tracks down and kills Steppenwolf in retaliation, and the murder reignites the war between the two sides. However, Steppenwolf appeared in the seemingly non-canon (despite Jack Kirby's involvement) Super Powers (1985) mini-series, and his entry in Who's Who in the DC Universe clarified that he had been resurrected by Apokoliptian technology.

Steppenwolf appears when Mister Miracle (Scott Free) gains godlike powers over life and death. Steppenwolf torments him over his role in killing Scott's mother (or alleged mother figure as is claimed) and in return is physically tortured. Free ends up healing him, instead of killing him as he desires. He is sent away with Darkseid's legions.

He is seen in New Gods (vol. 2) #6, with a new costume (a Kirby redesign for the figure's Super Powers action figure). Though considered a "mockery", Steppenwolf is given the job of running Darkseid's military forces. He is later seen fighting the Flash (Barry Allen) and the Justice League of America.

In Terror Titans #2, Steppenwolf appears as a member of the board of the Dark Side Club. He is killed by Clock King, who was using the club for gladiator fights and cruel amusements.

The New 52
With The New 52 reboot that followed the 2011 Flashpoint limited series, a new version of Earth-2 (home of the Justice Society of America) is introduced. In the continuity of that parallel world, Steppenwolf leads a massive invasion of the planet by Darkseid's parademons. Earth's heroes successfully repel the invaders, but that world's Superman, Batman, and Wonder Woman are killed in battle. Five years later, Steppenwolf is apparently hiding on Earth-2, and there is a $300 million reward for him. He is eventually killed by Bizarro, whom Steppenwolf had employed as a soldier and indoctrinated into fighting for Apokolips.

Steppenwolf also appears briefly in an issue of Justice League within The New 52. He participates in the torture of Superman on the Prime Earth. Steppenwolf is seen as support for Darkseid when he moves to attack the Anti-Monitor.

Powers and abilities
Steppenwolf is an immortal with vast superhuman strength, endurance and speed, capable of lifting about 10,000 tons and jumping huge distances easily. He has superhuman reflexes and a high degree of invulnerability, which increases with his battle armor and allows him to resist most physical and energetic attacks. 

He is an experienced military leader, having served as the head of Apokolips's armed forces, and when going into battle personally often commands units of the dog cavalry — warriors riding enormous dogs, known for the carnage and mass deaths he causes when he leads forces. 

Steppenwolf wields several weapons, including a cable-snare in which he can entrap opponents and from which he can fire lethal radion beams. His main weapon is his electro-axe. He is a master swordsman and a formidable hand-to-hand combatant forged in hundreds of battles.

In other media

Television

 Steppenwolf is featured in the TV shows set in the DC Animated Universe:
 Steppenwolf appears in the Superman: The Animated Series episode "Apokolips Now", voiced by Sherman Howard. He led a horde of Parademons against the city of Metropolis in his search for Superman. Steppenwolf's aircraft was then shot down by Dan Turpin piloting an Army chopper and fell into the ocean.
 Steppenwolf reappeared briefly in Part I of the Justice League episode "Twilight" voiced by René Auberjonois. Retreating from an aborted invasion of a world under New Genesis's protection, Steppenwolf's ship was crippled and teleported, via Boom Tube, right into Darkseid's stronghold. Steppenwolf was presumably killed beforehand by Orion.
 Steppenwolf appears in the Batman: The Brave and the Bold episode "Duel of the Double Crossers!", voiced by Kevin Michael Richardson. He appears as Mongul's champion of the arena; Batman and some other alien gladiators end up fighting him. Steppenwolf was defeated when Jonah Hex came to the aid of Batman. Steppenwolf also appears in "Death Race to Oblivion!", racing on Mongul's behalf against the other heroes and villains for the fate of Earth. After losing the race to Batman, Mongul blasts Steppenwolf for his failure.
 Steppenwolf appears in the Justice League Action episode "Under a Red Sun", voiced by Peter Jessop. He is visually depicted similarly to the way he is in Superman: The Animated Series. In a plot to become a legend on Apokolips, Steppenwolf transports himself and Superman to a planet with a red sun and attempts to kill him, but is ultimately defeated.

Film
 An alternate universe version of Steppenwolf makes a non-speaking cameo appearance in Justice League: Gods and Monsters.

DC Extended Universe

 Steppenwolf first appears, through the use of CGI effects, in the extended edition of Batman v Superman: Dawn of Justice (2016). Lex Luthor views a hologram of Steppenwolf, who has a similar appearance to his portrayal in Zack Snyder's Justice League, in the Kryptonian scout ship's Genesis chamber.
 Steppenwolf is featured in both the 2017 theatrical release and Zack Snyder's 2021 director's cut of Justice League, voiced and portrayed through motion-capture by Ciarán Hinds. Hinds received advice from Liam Neeson (who had done similar motion capture work in A Monster Calls) for his performance. Hinds has expressed frustration with the theatrical cut, which trimmed down much of his character's development and personality.
 In the theatrical release, Steppenwolf was exiled from Apokolips by Darkseid for failing to conquer Earth a millennium ago after his forces were defeated by a united front of humans, Amazons, Atlanteans, Olympian Gods, and Green Lanterns. When the three Mother Boxes that he had used in his initial invasion attempt are reawakened in the present day, Steppenwolf returns to Earth in hopes of conquering it to regain Darkseid's favor. In the final battle against the Justice League, he is defeated by the resurrected Superman which instills him with a new sense of fear, causing his army of Parademons to attack him and drag him through the Boom Tube back to Apokolips. The theatrical cut's version of Steppenwolf was negatively received by critics and fans alike, with criticism directed at the character's poor computer-generated design and generic demeanor. It was later reported that Steppenwolf's appearance and personality were drastically altered during Joss Whedon's retooling of the film, which was criticized by Screen Rant for being "too family-friendly" and "forgettable".
 In Zack Snyder's Justice League, Steppenwolf was banished from Apokolips for attempting to betray Darkseid, owing him a debt of fifty-thousand worlds before he can return to his home planet. He is called to Earth when the Mother Boxes, left behind by Darkseid following his failed invasion attempt aeons ago, are reactivated in the wake of Superman's death. During Steppenwolf's quest on Earth, he finds the fabled Anti-Life Equation that Darkseid seeks and reports his discovery to DeSaad. Darkseid gives Steppenwolf a chance at redemption by uniting the Mother Boxes to prepare for his arrival. Steppenwolf and his Parademon forces overwhelm the Justice League until a resurrected Superman arrives and defeats him. The Mother Boxes are nonetheless synchronized and Steppenwolf manages to terraform Earth for Darkseid, but the Flash taps into the Speed Force and reverses time to undo this. Aquaman impales Steppenwolf and Superman punches him through the Boom Tube while Wonder Woman decapitates him, sending his corpse hurtling back to Apokolips at Darkseid's feet. This depiction of Steppenwolf received a far warmer reception from fans and critics, with praise directed at his monstrous and alien design, his more menacing and sinister presence, and his greater level of character depth and development in contrast to his theatrical counterpart.
 Steppenwolf is briefly mentioned by Mera in the Aquaman film when recounting Arthur Curry's previous achievements.

Video games
 Steppenwolf appears as a playable character in Lego DC Super-Villains, voiced by Peter Jessop reprising his role from Justice League Action.

References

External links
 DCU Guide: Steppenwolf

Characters created by Jack Kirby
Comics characters introduced in 1972
DC Comics deities
DC Comics characters who can move at superhuman speeds
DC Comics characters with superhuman strength
DC Comics extraterrestrial supervillains
DC Comics military personnel
DC Comics supervillains
Fictional axefighters
Fictional characters with superhuman durability or invulnerability
Fictional commanders
Fictional generals
Fictional murderers
Fictional royalty
Fictional swordfighters in comics
New Gods of Apokolips
Superman characters
DC Comics male supervillains